Pauline Marie Pfeiffer (July 22, 1895 – October 1, 1951) was an American journalist, and the second wife of writer Ernest Hemingway.

Early life
Pfeiffer was born in Parkersburg, Iowa to Paul Pfeiffer, a real estate agent, and Mary Alice Downey, on July 22, 1895, moving to St. Louis in 1901, where she went to school at Visitation Academy of St. Louis. Although her family later moved to Piggott, Arkansas, Pfeiffer stayed in Missouri to study at the University of Missouri School of Journalism, graduating in 1918. After working at newspapers in Cleveland and New York, Pfeiffer switched to magazines, working for Vanity Fair and Vogue. A move to Paris for Vogue led to her meeting Hemingway and his first wife, Hadley Richardson, in 1926.

Marriage to Hemingway
In the spring of 1926, Hadley Richardson, the first wife of Ernest Hemingway, became aware of Hemingway's affair with Pauline, and in July, Pauline joined the couple for their annual trip to Pamplona. On their return to Paris, Hadley and Hemingway decided to separate, and in November, Hadley formally requested a divorce. They were divorced in January 1927.

Hemingway married Pauline in May 1927, and they went to Le Grau-du-Roi on a honeymoon.  Pauline's family was wealthy and Catholic; before the marriage, Hemingway converted to Catholicism. By the end of the year Pauline, who was pregnant, wanted to move back to America. John Dos Passos recommended Key West, and they left Paris in March 1928.

They had two children, Patrick and Gloria (born Gregory). Hemingway drew upon Pfeiffer's difficult labor with one child as the basis for his character Catherine's death in A Farewell to Arms. Pfeiffer's devout Roman Catholic beliefs led to her support of the Nationalists during the Spanish Civil War while Hemingway backed the Republicans.

In 1937, on a trip to Spain, Hemingway began an affair with Martha Gellhorn. Pfeiffer and he were divorced on November 4, 1940, and he married Gellhorn three weeks later.

Later life and death
Pfeiffer spent the rest of her life in Key West, with frequent visits to California, until her death on October 1, 1951, at age 56. Her death was attributed to an acute state of shock related to her child, then known as Gregory's arrest and a subsequent phone call from Ernest. Gregory, later known as Gloria, had experienced gender identity issues for most of her life, had been arrested for entering the women's restroom in a movie theater. Years later, after becoming a medical doctor, Gloria interpreted her mother's autopsy report as indicating that she had died due to a pheochromocytoma tumor on one of her adrenal glands. Her theory was that the phone call from Ernest had caused the tumor to secrete excessive adrenaline, and then stop, the resultant change in blood pressure causing her mother to go into acute shock that caused her death.

References

Sources

 Baker, Carlos. Ernest Hemingway: A Life Story. Charles Scribner's Sons (1969). New York. 
 Mellow, James R. Hemingway: A Life Without Consequences. Houghton Mifflin (1992). New York. 
 Meyers, Jeffrey. Hemingway: A Biography. Macmillan (1985). London.

External links

Hemingway-Pfeiffer timeline
Official biography, Hemingway-Pfeiffer Museum & Educational Center Website.
Unbelievable Happiness and Final Sorrow: The Hemingway-Pfeiffer Marriage

1895 births
1951 deaths
Hemingway family
Burials at Hollywood Forever Cemetery
People from Parkersburg, Iowa
People from Piggott, Arkansas
Missouri School of Journalism alumni
Catholics from Iowa
Catholics from Arkansas
American expatriates in France